Miodrag Todorčević (Миодраг Тодорчевић; born 10 November 1940, in Belgrade) a Serbian-French chess master and coach.

In his chess career, he represented Yugoslavia/Serbia (till 1968 and 1977–2003), France (1968–1977), and Spain (since 2003).

He won five times in Paris City Chess Championship (1966, 1967, 1973, 1974, 1976) and won French Chess Championship at Dijon 1975.

Todorcevic played twice for France in Chess Olympiads in 1972 and 1974.

He was awarded the Grandmaster title in 1989. His current Elo rating is 2450.

References

External links
 
 

1940 births
Living people
Serbian chess players
French chess players
Spanish chess players
Chess grandmasters
Chess Olympiad competitors
Chess coaches